Corinth is an unincorporated community in Lee County, Texas, United States. By 1900, Corinth had a school called Corinthian which was also used as a church. The school closed in the early 1950s, and by 2000 all that remained of the community was the church and cemetery.

References

Unincorporated communities in Lee County, Texas
Unincorporated communities in Texas